Kenny Macintyre may refer to:

Kenny Macintyre (political journalist) (1944–1999), Scottish political journalist
Kenny Macintyre (sports broadcaster), his son, Scottish sports broadcaster

See also
Kenny McEntyre (born 1970), American football player